Oregon Route 164 is an Oregon state highway running from Interstate 5 in Marion County north of Millersburg to I-5 at Millersburg in Linn County. OR 164 is known as the Jefferson Highway No. 164 (see Oregon highways and routes).

OR 164 was established in 2002 as part of Oregon's project to assign route numbers to highways that previously were not assigned.

Route description 

It heads southeast and south to Jefferson, and then turns southwest to rejoin I-5 at Millersburg.

History 

The Jefferson Highway was designated as US 99E in 1926.  After the completion of the Willamette Valley section of Interstate 5 in the 1960s, US 99E between Salem and Albany was realigned to travel as one co-signed road with the new freeway.

OR 164 was assigned to the Jefferson Highway in 2002.

Major intersections

References 

 Oregon Department of Transportation, Descriptions of US and Oregon Routes, https://web.archive.org/web/20051102084300/http://www.oregon.gov/ODOT/HWY/TRAFFIC/TEOS_Publications/PDF/Descriptions_of_US_and_Oregon_Routes.pdf, page 27.
 Oregon Department of Transportation, Jefferson Highway No. 164, ftp://ftp.odot.state.or.us/tdb/trandata/maps/slchart_pdfs_1980_to_2002/Hwy164_1997.pdf

164
Transportation in Marion County, Oregon
Transportation in Linn County, Oregon